Munskaya is a rural locality (a village) in Vozhegodsky District, Vologda Oblast, Russia. The population was 2 as of 2002.

Geography 
Munskaya is located 67 km southwest of Vozhega (the district's administrative centre) by road. Myshino is the nearest rural locality.

References 

Rural localities in Vozhegodsky District